The Roman Catholic Diocese of Ocaña is a diocese located in the city of Ocaña in the Ecclesiastical province of Nueva Pamplona in Colombia.

The diocese was created on 26 October 1962 by Pope John XXIII, covering the departments of Norte de Santander and Cesar. It covers 18,000 km², and includes 18 towns and two townships in the municipality of La Esperanza (whose head belongs to the Nueva Pamplona).

History
26 October 1962: Established as Diocese of Ocaña from the Diocese of Santa Marta

Ordinaries
Rafael Sarmiento Peralta † (26 Oct 1962 – 24 Jul 1972) Appointed, Bishop of Neiva
Ignacio José Gómez Aristizábal (24 Jul 1972 – 10 Oct 1992) Appointed, Archbishop of Santa Fe de Antioquia
Jorge Enrique Lozano Zafra (28 Jun 1993 – 15 May 2014) Retired
Gabriel Ángel Villa Vahos (15 May 2014 – 11 Feb 2020) Appointed, Archbishop of Tunja
Luis Gabriel Ramírez Díaz (27 February 2021 – 8 January 2023)

See also
Roman Catholicism in Colombia

Sources

External links
 GCatholic.org

Roman Catholic dioceses in Colombia
Roman Catholic Ecclesiastical Province of Nueva Pamplona
Christian organizations established in 1962
Roman Catholic dioceses and prelatures established in the 20th century
Ocaña, Norte de Santander